David John O'Keefe  (21 August 1864 – 21 July 1943) was an Australian politician and journalist. He was a member of the Australian Labor Party (ALP) and served in both houses of federal parliament, as a Senator for Tasmania (1901–1906, 1910–1920) and holding the House of Representatives (1922–1925). He subsequently entered state parliament, serving as Speaker of the Tasmanian House of Assembly (1934–1942). Prior to entering politics he had been the editor of the Zeehan and Dundas Herald on Tasmania's west coast.

Early life
O'Keefe was "probably" born on 21 August 1864 in Longford, Tasmania. He was the son of Mary Ann (née McCullagh) and David John O'Keefe, his father being a farmer. He attended the state school in Carrick until the age of 14, after which he worked as a labourer and farmhand. He moved to Beaconsfield at the age of 17 and worked as a gold miner for four years, operating the stamp battery used to process the results of quartz reef mining. O'Keefe subsequently purchased a small newsagency in Beaconsfield, which was destroyed in a fire but later rebuilt. He was also the Beaconsfield correspondent for Launceston's Daily Telegraph.

In 1891, O'Keefe moved to Zeehan on Tasmania's west coast. He was the editor of the Zeehan and Dundas Herald from 1894 to 1899. He "made a study of mineralogy and put his learning to good use by writing many articles on west-coast mines for Tasmanian and mainland newspapers, as well as examining and reporting on many mining propositions". After resigning from the Herald in 1899 he moved to Queensland and reported for Melbourne's Argus on the copper fields at Chillagoe and Mount Garnet.

Federal politics
In 1901, O'Keefe was elected to the Australian Senate, running with endorsement from the Protectionist Party, as there was no Labour Party in Tasmania at the time; however, he joined the Australian Labor Party caucus in Parliament. He was defeated in 1906, but re-elected in 1910, serving until his defeat in 1919 (taking effect in 1920). O'Keefe served as Chairman of Committees from 1910 to 1914.

In 1922, he was elected to the House of Representatives, defeating Labor-turned-Nationalist MP William Laird Smith for the seat of Denison. He was the first Tasmanian to have served in both houses of federal parliament.

Later life
He was defeated in 1925 by Nationalist Sir John Gellibrand and worked in Western Australia for some time before returning to Tasmania in 1931. In 1934 O'Keefe was elected to the Tasmanian House of Assembly, immediately taking the position of Speaker. He held the Speaker's position until 1942 and died the following year.

References

1864 births
1943 deaths
Australian Labor Party members of the Parliament of Australia
Members of the Australian Senate for Tasmania
Members of the Australian Senate
Members of the Australian House of Representatives for Denison
Members of the Australian House of Representatives
Speakers of the Tasmanian House of Assembly
Australian people of Irish descent
Australian Companions of the Order of St Michael and St George
20th-century Australian politicians